The Oerlikon KBA is a 25 mm (25×137mm) autocannon, developed as a close range multipurpose weapon for the mechanised battlefield, originally made by Oerlikon (now Rheinmetall AG) and currently produced in Rheinmetall Italia S.p.A. facilities. It is a positively locked breech, gas-operated cannon with a rotating bolt head and a dual-belt selective feed system taking a 25mm NATO cartridge. The rate of fire in burst mode is 600 rounds per minute but it can be adjusted electronically and reduced to single shot or a selectable range between 100 and 200 rounds per minute.

Due to its firepower, its range of ammunition and its "Instant Ammunition Selection Device" (IASD), which allows the gunner to easily switch between armor-piercing and high-explosive rounds, the KBA cannon can engage lightly armoured vehicles, infantry, anti-tank positions, helicopters, combat aircraft and ships.

Description 
The Oerlikon KBA 25 mm is a fully automatic cannon based on the proven gas-operation principle with a rotating bolt head similar to the Mauser M 98 or M16 and double belt feed for the ammunition.

The KBA offers a wide range of firing modes: single shot, programmable rapid single shot with a rate of fire programmable from 100 to 200 rds/min and full automatic fire at 600 rds/min. The cannon functions, such as cocking and firing, are electrically actuated by a remote control unit or manually in auxiliary mode by means of a hand crank and a trigger pedal.

The Oerlikon KBA 25mm cannon has been designed for integration in various types of mounts, small size and low weight offering various integration possibilities such as: 
 Human-Operated or Remote Controlled Weapon Station (RCWS) for Infantry Fighting Vehicles (IFV), Armoured Personnel Carriers (APC), Light Armoured Vehicles (LAV) and Armoured 4x4;
 Air defence gun mounts;
 Naval weapon station;
 Helicopter mounts.

The various types of available ammunition combined with the unique Instant Ammunition Selection Device and selectable rates of fire support any type of operational use.

History 
At the turn of 1964-65, the US Army started the ambitious Bushmaster project as an offshoot of the MICV-65 program to replace the M113 armored personnel carrier with a new infantry fighting vehicle. The Bushmaster project aimed to create small-caliber cannon for the US Army.

The Bushmaster project were intended to meet the requirements for the armament of infantry fighting vehicles of the 80's and 90's:
 Ammunition performance: 25 mm armour steel, 60° (NATO) angle of impact, 1000m range, corresponding to the armour of a well-armoured infantry fighting vehicle;
 Instant ammunition selection: for engagement of different targets;
 Selectable firing mode: Accurate single-shot, bursts with a rate of fire of more than 550 rds/min for engagement of aircraft;
 Compact structure: with low weight for installation in gun turrets of APC's;
 Simple to operate and service: in the hands of infantry.
At the early stage of the Bushmaster program, one of the companies involved was the Jet and Ordnance Division of Thompson Ramo Wooldridge Inc. (soon to become TRW Inc.) which started the development of their own 25mm weapon.

The new TRW project was to design an automatic cannon around the experimental 25x137mm cartridge under the company internal designation of "TRW model 6425".  The project leader was engineer Eugene Stoner, the designer of the famous ArmaLite AR-10, AR-15, and M16A1 family of assault rifles.

TRW's requirements for the 25mm project were that the gun had to be fully automatic and actively locked, be operated by gas and with a rotating bolt head, and use a dual-belt selective feed system allowing a quick and easy switch between different ammunition types.

In parallel Oerlikon-Bührle assumed responsibility for developing the new 25x137mm ammunition and the interior ballistics of the TRW 6425.

The first prototype was produced in 22 months and began test firing in November 1965 from an Ml 14 vehicle. In December the prototype was fired from an Austrian Armored Personnel Carrier. An early version was tested by a number of countries including Great Britain and France.

At the beginning of 1967, technical tests and firing trials were carried out with two TRW-6425 prototype cannons followed by the first demonstrations for a NATO country.

The early configuration was tested several times at Aberdeen Proving Ground, included was a Military Potential Test from March 1968 to March 1969.

Before the U.S. tests were completed the US Army paused the new IFV project due to the Vietnam War situation. At the end of 1969 TRW ceased work on the TRW 6425 cannon. In 1970 the Jet and Ordnance Division of TRW Inc. was closed and Stoner, together with Robert Bihun, launched ARES Inc.

As ARES Inc. quickly outgrew Stoner's garage, they moved the company into the same buildings previously used by TRW Inc. and hired many of their former employees.

At least six models of the TRW-6425 automatic cannons were built.

Following the closure of the TRW Jet and Ordnance Division, the Philco-Ford company's Aeronutronic Division became interested in the TRW-6425 cannon project, bought the rights to the project and began work on the weapon.

When the Bushmaster projectfull name U.S. Army Vehicle Rapid Fire Weapons System (Bushmaster)was restarted, the PFB-25 (Philco-Ford Bushmaster 25mm) was selected as one of the self-powered gun candidates. Since then, Philco-Ford has further developed the PFB-25. 

During the same period Oerlikon bought the TRW-6425 rights from TRW and they started the "KBA series" 25mm cannon project based on it. In the designation KBA, "K" is kanone; "B" is a 25 mm caliber, and "A" is a design model in a given caliber. Several principles were combined in order to refine the project.

During the trials, however, the original American PFB-25 prototypes displayed a number of basic functional deficiencies. This prompted Oerlikon to undertake further development work on the KBA. The resulting system modifications added functional reliability that allowed the trials to be completed successfully in 1970. When the first prototype KBA cannons became available, suitable gun turrets had also to be provided.

Oerlikon extensively reworked the original American TRW 6425 design. Perhaps the only remaining elements of the original design in the KBA were the 25x137 mm cartridge and the method of blocking the chamber by turning the bolt (a novelty for Oerlikon development; earlier Oerlikon systems had sliding bolts with locking lugs). Eugene Stoner's classic TRW-6425 cannon automatic gas valve drive was also comprehensively changed.

The complete systemcannon, hand-driven turret and ammunitionunderwent detailed firing trials between 1969 and 1971.

Oerlikon devoted huge development efforts to improve the functional reliability, durability and firing precision of the KBA autocannon. In 1971 sufficient progress had been made for the weapon system to fulfill the strict specifications laid down and for large-scale deliveries to the Netherlands to begin.

In 1977, due to an internal decision, the US Army selected the externally-powered Hughes M242 from Hughes Helicopters Ordnance Division as the Bushmaster.  The M242 became the autocannon for the Army's new IFV.

Within the framework of the product support service Oerlikon improves the product and adapts it regularly to the latest requirements. An important step forward was made in 1982/83 when the ammunition penetration performance range of the 25 mm APDS-T (sub-caliber) round was increased 150% from 1000 to 2500 m.

Ammunition 
A wide range of ammunition has been developed for this weapon specifically developed to engage and defeat both ground and air targets.The ammunition complies with all handling and operational safety requirements according to MIL-STD's, and was subjected to intensive trials by NATO member countries prior to its introduction and standardization as NATO 25mmx137 ammunition.

The current 25x137mm ammunition family consists in different combat (air - ground) and training rounds types as follow:

 APFSDS-T: Armour-Piercing Fin Stabilized Discarding Sabot with tracer, for use against armoured ground targets;
 APDS-T: Armour-Piercing Discarding Sabot with tracer, for use against armoured ground targets;
 FAPDS-T: Frangible Armour-Piercing Discarding Sabot with tracer, for use against air, ground and urban targets;
 SAPHEI-T: Semi-Armour-Piercing High Explosive Incendiary with tracer, for use against well protected targets;
 PELE: Penetrator with Enhanced Lateral Effect, for use against armoured ground targets without explosive charge;
 PELE-PEN: Penetrator with Enhanced Lateral Effect with Penetrator, for use against armoured ground targets without explosive charge;
 HEIAP: High Explosive Incendiary and Armor-Piercing, for use against armoured ground targets;
 HEI-T: High Explosive Incendiary with tracer, for use against lightly protected targets;
 HE-T: High Explosive with tracer, for use against lightly protected targets;
 MP-T: Multipurpose with tracer, designed to defeat a broad range of targets from soft skinned to armored target and building constructions;
 TPDS-T: Target Practice Discarding Sabot with tracer, a short range trainer for the above sub-calibre types;
 TP-T: Target Practice with tracer, used for training.

Mounting and Weapon Stations
These are the characteristics of the best-known KBA autocannon weapons stations in use and presently in production:

VALHALLA Turrets 
The company VALHALLA Turrets has developed a remote controlled weapon station called the Valhalla NIMROD 250,  designed mainly for IFVs, 4x4 vehicles, tanks and light armoured fighting vehicles.

The NIMROD 250 turret is designed to mount a 25mm Oerlikon KBA (25x137mm) autocannon paired with a high performance electro–optic system (cooled and un-cooled). A co-axial machine gun provides fire support for the main cannon.

ASELSAN 

The Turkish-made Aselsan STOP stabilized weapon station for naval applications can be fitted with a Oerlikon KBA.

The Turkish-made Aselsan NEFER-L remote controlled weapon station is developed primarily for use against armored land targets.

LEONARDO (OTO Melara) 

OTO Melara (today LEONARDO) has developed a two-man turret for armored vehicles called HITFIST. The turret is designed to mount a 25mm Oerlikon KBA or 30mm ATK Mk44 autocannon. The main armament may mount a co-axial machine gun, a variant allows the operator to aim and fire anti-tank missiles. Current operators includes Italy, Poland and Romania. 

OTO Melara has also developed the OTO SINGLE 25mm KBA  as a stabilized, electric servo-drive assisted weapon station, for naval applications with 252 ready-to-fire rounds made to neutralize targets in the Anti Surface Warfare, particularly in the Asymmetric Warfare or Mine Defence scenarios and thanks to the high rate of fire of the 25mm KBA cannon also offers a capability in very close Anti Air Defense. The OTO SINGLE 25mm KBA turret is available in both unmanned or manned configurations.

Others 
The KBA 25mm Automatic Cannon is installed in many other weapon station designs produced by different defense companies, here below a list of the most famous:

 OTO Quadruple Gun turret (e.g. in the SIDAM 25);
 OTO T25S / T25 turrets (in the VCC-Dardo);
 OTO Spallaccia 25mm;
 FMC Turret Type EWS turret (e.g. in the YPR-765);
 Israeli OWS-25R turret (e.g. in the MLI-84);
 Type 87 ARV turret;
 Oerlikon GBD-ADA turret.

Operators

Current operators 

Italian Navy
LHD Trieste Aircraft Carrier
CVH 550 Cavour Aircraft Carrier
San Giorgio-class Amphibious transport dock
FREMM Multipurpose frigate
Horizon-class Frigate
Thaon di Revel-class Offshore patrol vessel
Comandanti-class Patrol vessel
Cassiopea-class Patrol vessel
Sirio-class Patrol vessel
Minerva-class Corvette
Vulcano-class Logistic support ship
Etna-class Replenishment oiler
Stromboli-class Replenishment oiler
Elettra Navy SIGINT vessel
Italian Coast Guard
Diciotti-class Offshore patrol vessel
Italian Army
IFV Freccia Infantry Fighting Vehicle
IFV Dardo Infantry Fighting Vehicle
SIDAM 25 Self-propelled anti-aircraft gun (decommissioned)

 Leader-Class Offshore patrol vessel
 Sobuj Bangla-class Inshore patrol vessel
 
 ACV-300
ASELSAN 25 mm STOP Stabilized Naval Gun System
 
YPR-765

AIFV-25
 
 Type 87 ARV Reconnaissance and Patrol Vehicle

FNSS ACV-15
 
 MLI-84 Tracked infantry fighting vehicle

AIFV-25 

Navy Forces "Fleet Tanker"

AIFV-25 
 
AIFV-25 

AIFV-25 

AIFV-25 

P61 Offshore Patrol Vessel
P71 Offshore Patrol Vessel - OTO SINGLE 25mm KBA (RCWS)

C92 Turkmen-class corvette

Kalaat Béni Abbès amphibious transport dock

Former operators  
 
AIFV-B-C25 with a 25 mm Oerlikon KBA-B02 cannon

 YPR-765 pri (pantser-rups-infanterie)

References 

Oerlikon-Contraves
Autocannon
25 mm artillery
Military equipment introduced in the 1970s